Magical Pokémon Journey, originally published in Japan as , is a shōjo manga series set in the fictional universe of the Pokémon franchise. The manga is by Yumi Tsukirino and serialized by Shogakukan in the manga magazine Ciao, and collected in ten bound volumes. The series is not based on any particular video game, and it is the first shōjo Pokémon manga series released in the United States. The original Japanese title "PiPiPi" refers to Purin, Pippi, and Pikachu, the respective Japanese names of Jigglypuff, Clefairy, and Pikachu.

The main character, Hazel (Maron in Japanese), sets off to catch Pokémon after a scientist named Grandpa agrees to make a love potion if she catches Pokémon. Hazel is after the heart of a boy named Almond. Most of the Pokémon in the manga series can speak a human language. Jason Thompson, author of Manga: The Complete Guide, wrote that, based on the plot, it "might as well not be about Pokémon at all".

The manga is licensed in English in North America by Viz Media and in Singapore by Chuang Yi. Viz published seven of the ten volumes flipped to the Western left-to-right format.

A spinoff series, features the adventures and exploits of Clefairy and Pikachu, as well as Torchic and Mightyena. The chamo-chamo refers to "Achamo", Torchic's Japanese name.

Characters

Humans
 
The main character of this series. She's a bubble-headed blonde who's madly in love with her friend Almond, and adores cute Pokémon such as Pikachu and Clefairy. As a child, she was an irrepressible tomboy who enjoyed playing pranks on Almond; now that she's older, she's still quite hyper, but in a more girlish way.

 
The love interest of the series. He calls himself a Pokémon trainer, but it's not known what Pokémon he has, or even if he has any besides Squirtle, who is more of a friend than a trained Pokémon. Almond shows little to no interest in either Hazel or Coconut, until the final volume...

 
Grandpa's granddaughter, and Hazel's rival for Almond's love. She's a brilliant scientist, and so spends much of her time brewing love potions that backfire in some manner, usually injuring her Eevee. Later on, a man named Caraway confesses his love for Coconut, but she isn't interested.

 
Isn't Hazel's grandfather, as she points out to Almond when Coconut first appears. He's simply a crazy old man whom everybody calls "Grandpa". He likes to ogle young women, even though he's married to Ginger. He made Hazel the outfit she wears much of the time; it has magical properties that can protect her from injury and even drowning. Owns  POG  Inc., but left because running a business isn't fun, and Ginger took over for him.

 
A sickly boy who recently moved to Hazel's town for reasons related to his health. His Pokémon is a hotheaded Charmander. His bad health is caused by a mass of dark qi surrounding him; he is able to communicate with and control this qi, which is quite unusual.

 
Peanut's brother, a florist who has a thing for Hazel. Due to a mix-up on Viz's website, many people believe that in the Japanese version of the manga, he's really attracted to Almond; however, this is not true. Pistachio's Bulbasaur, named Danerina, has a crush on him, as does Chiko the Chikorita.

 
A ninja-in-training under the great ninja master Ditto. He's a bumbling goof, though. When he's not training, he works in his family's bakery. Wal wears glasses when not training, and contact lenses when in ninja uniform.

 
A 150-year-old ghost. When she first appears, Raichu is angry with her. Sandy's parents left him in a box by the ocean because he had a tendency to shock people, and Sandy promised to meet him there; however, just before they could meet, they were both killed by a tidal wave. Once Sandy explains this, Raichu forgives her and they are able to "cross over". They appear in later chapters to help pacify an angry Golduck ghost, and are reincarnated in the final volume.

 
First appears in the eighth volume. Since only the first seven volumes were translated into English in America, most fans don't know of her, even though she's an important character. She is also a ninja-in-training, though she's much more accomplished than Walnut. Her master, Azumarill, is even more talented than Ditto; Azumarill's daughter, a Marill named Marimaru, is Koume's partner. Apricot is addicted to bread, and winds up falling in love with Walnut.

 
First appears in the ninth volume. She's an exorcist nurse who travels around with her senior, a Chansey, exorcising bad qi. She discovers the reason for Peanut's ill health, but she is unable to exorcise it. She falls in love with Peanut.

 
First appears in the tenth and final volume. As soon as he meets Coconut, he falls for her and kisses her on the lips. Because of this, Coconut absolutely refuses to even give him a chance, until he helps her with an experiment she's working on. After that, she becomes friends with Caraway, but still isn't romantically interested in him.

 
First  appears  in  the  seventh  volume. She  is  Grandpa's  wife! She  came  to  issue  him  a challenge 'Win  best  inventions  prize  at  the  upcoming 
inventors  contest  or  move  back  home. She  has  a Natu  and  Girafarig. She  is  currently  running  POG  Inc.!

 
A character featured in the spin-off series after obtaining her first Pokémon, Torchic. She is based on, or as largely same as May from Pokémon anime series, with only costumes changed.

Pokémon characters
 
The first Pokémon to appear in this series, is Hazel's best friend -- not surprising, as both of them can be described as scatterbrains. Pikachu is one of the few Pokémon in MPJ who cannot speak human language. Pikachu appears as a male one.

 
Hazel's second Pokémon friend, and is a scaredy cat. He dislikes battling because he views himself as weak, even though his Metronome technique is quite powerful. He also uses Minimize often, usually when he gets frightened (which can happen at the drop of a hat).

 
A spoiled princess Pokémon whose family lives in a castle. Jigglypuff loves to cook, but she's terrible at it while looks delicious at first glance. Not seeming to realize this, she gets horribly offended when nobody wants to eat the food she makes.

 
The only boy Pokémon to live at the Jigglypuff mansion. He calls Almond his "big brother", but at the same time seems to be absorbed by him.

 
Coconut's Pokémon and lab assistant. He's usually in the way when her experiments go wrong, and is quite an unlucky fellow. In the sixth volume, he meets and falls in love with...

 
A female Eevee. At first, she loved Eevee from afar, but she managed to confess her feelings to him at the prompting of Hazel and Coconut. Later, she has to move away, but she occasionally visits Eevee.

 
Peanut's companion, and his fiery temper is in stark contrast to the boy's quiet personality. Charmander gets angry when things don't go his way, which happens more often than not. At first he seemed to have a thing for Coconut's Eevee (who is male), but in later volumes he seems more attracted to Chiko.

 
Danerina is Pistachio's Bulbasaur. She seems to be possessive and will get angry if Pistachio talks to other women.

 
Wal's ninja master. He's a quite accomplished ninja, even though he's just a pink blob.

 
The Marill is Koume's ninja partner, both of them training under Marimaru's mother, Azumarill.

  
Two of Caraway's Pokémon. Roko the Vulpix (Rokon is the Japanese name of Vulpix) has a thing for Arashi the Cyndaquil (Hinoarashi is the Japanese name of Cyndaquil), despite his being somewhat dim-witted. They meet Coconut while searching for a Fire Stone.

 
Plum's senior, an exorcist nurse. She uses her magical egg powers in conjunction with Plum's cross to purify people troubled by bad qi.

 
Sandy's Pokémon, was abandoned by the shore.

 
Appears in order to challenge Danerina the Bulbasaur's claim on Pistachio. They have a contest to see which one is good enough to him, with Chiko winning. However, Pistachio prefers Danerina's company, as she is his Pokémon and Chiko is an interloper. (But Pistachio's not thrilled with the Pokémon being in love with him....) After this, Chikorita falls in love with Almond, and then with Charmander.

 
A male Bayleef belonging to a traveling psychic named Akira. He has a thing for Chiko, but she prefers Charmander.

 
Azumarill is Apricot's ninja teacher and Marimaru's mother.

 
Owned by Haruka, Torchic quickly meets and becomes friends with Pikachu and Clefairy, and then meets Poochyena, with whom she winds up arguing frequently. Soon after that, she meets Mightyena, Poochyena's older brother, who she falls in love with. Torchic dreads the thought of ever evolving. She believes that Combusken and Blaziken are ugly Pokémon and can't stand the thought of not being cute and adorable anymore.

Owned by Kanata, Poochyena is introduced where Torchic mistakes him as a Prince Charming. Poochyena doesn't get along with Torchic at all; he calls her "shorty" and she calls him "hick-Poochy". However, he congratulates her for doing well in a Contest, and comforts her when she's upset at times.

The older brother of Poochyena, Mightyena meets Torchic and falls in love with her. Unlike his brother, he is considered to be much more tolerant with Torchic.

Other Pokémon characters
Articuno
A male legendary-bird Pokémon, he was thought to have trapped souls of lost travelers in the mountains however, he only appears as a friendly and cheerful-looking Pokémon that runs a snowcone shop. He challenges Pikachu, Clefairy and Jigglypuff by making them eat 50 snowcones. He also saved Hazel who got injured by skiing in the mountains.

Onix
A harmless and friendly rock snake Pokémon, he only appears to save humans. However, he also appears as a challenging boss character, to battle against humans. He is defeated by Almond's Squirtle with his Water Gun attack, and rewards both the humans and Pokémon a legendary stone.

Tangela
A Pokémon that resembles a tangle of vines with a small face hidden in the center. Hazel wants to see what Tangela's face looks like beneath the vines. However, Tangela is frightened by the intrusive Hazel and constricts her. Luckily, the confusion is settled and Tangela, who communicates by pressing a vine to a person's forehead, agrees to let Hazel see its face. Though because of her clumsy painting skills, still no one knows how Tangela looks like of except Hazel.

Dragonair
A male dragon Pokémon, he appears in the sky snowing. Although he is cold-blooded when he met Jigglypuff, Jigglypuff asked him where Articuno's hideout was, so he leads their way to where his hideout is.

Jynx
A fortune-teller, she can read minds from both humans and Pokémon with her magic ball. Arbok tries to tell her he's in love with Jigglypuff's sister, Wigglytuff. She had nothing to do with making Arbok fall in love with Wigglytuff.

Pidgeot
In love with Pidgetta, leading the three Pidgeotto (Pidgeot's servants and henchmen), Hazel's mistaken them for eating Pikachu but tied him up as a gift to Pidgetta, he'll do anything to win her back.

Pidgetta
A female Pidgeotto, she dislikes Pidgeot by bringing gifts and other items to match her beauty, but she only wants the wilted flower that was picked by Hazel. She finally falls in love with him again.

Golbat
Most vicious and unfriendly vampire bat Pokémon, they can hunt down other any Pokémon in the dark caves, they attack intruders by finding them with their sonic waves.

Ditto
Shape-shifters, these Dittos are found at the hot springs resort. Once they shifted into a bunch of Pikachu and Hazel and the others had a little trouble with that. They  apologized  and  left  after  some  time  of  tricking  them.  No relation to Ditto the ninja master.

A wood gecko Pokémon who likes to pluck Torchic's feathers. He has two sisters, Grovyle and Sceptile.

Antagonists in Chamo-Chamo Pretty sequel as they fighting with Torchic and Poochyena for not getting chocolates during Valentine's Day.

Volumes and chapters

Reception
Jason Thompson rated the series two and one half stars, arguing that it is "curious but enjoyable" with "cute and clean" stick figure artwork and jokes that "are funnier than the material demands".

See also
Pokémon (manga)
Pokémon Adventures

References

External links
Archive of Viz Kids' Magical Pokémon Journey website

1997 manga
Shōjo manga
Pokémon manga
Viz Media manga
Shogakukan manga